Talking to the Dead is a two-part British television crime drama, written by Gwyneth Hughes and directed by China Moo-Young, that first broadcast on Sky Living on 15 October 2013. The series, which stars Sophie Rundle and Russell Tovey in the principal roles, follows Fiona Griffiths (Rundle), a detective constable with the Cardiff Major Crimes Squad, who tries to solve the murders of a prostitute and her daughter, while dealing with the effects of Cotard's syndrome, which has left her with a deep and peculiar empathy for the dead.

The series was broadcast as the fifth and final project in the Drama Matters strand,  a strand designed by Sky Living bosses to highlight the ability of female actors in leading roles. The series is based upon the novel of the same name by Harry Bingham, and also stars Mark Lewis Jones, Lois Winstone, Christine Tremarco and Keith Allen in leading roles. The series was released on Region 2 DVD in the Netherlands in 2014.

Reception
The series broadcast to mixed reception, with Alison Graham of the Radio Times writing; "One day someone will invent a female detective who’ll cleverly solve crimes, who will work within the rules and who will return home to a nice partner with whom she has a happy relationship. Until then we have the likes of unkempt, very young DC Fiona Griffiths, who clumsily drops her files on her first day as a rookie member of the Cardiff major crimes team and who, though very bright, is obviously battling unspecified demons. Talking to the Dead is a woolly, hard-to-fathom story that is saved entirely by the winning Rundle, who you will want to see again."

Jane Simon of The Mirror wrote a similar review, commenting; "The last in the Drama Matters series is my least favourite but, ironically, the one most likely to go to a full series because it’s another off-kilter police procedural of the kind TV viewers can’t seem to get their fill of. It’s also the only one in the run to be served up in two parts with the concluding half on Thursday. Sophie Rundle, who’s currently being so ballsy in Peaky Blinders, stars as the terrifyingly young-looking detective constable Fiona Griffiths with Russell Tovey as a fellow cop. I was really looking forward to the moment when Fiona would solve her first murder by actually talking to the dead, or more specifically, the moment when the dead would talk to her. But like Wire in the Blood and Waking the Dead, that title promises much more spookiness than it delivers."

Ellen Jones of The Independent published a slightly more positive review, writing; "Detective Fiona Griffiths began her first day in a new job by clumsily dropping all her casework folders at the feet of her CO. Apparently, she's old enough to be investigating murders, despite looking approximately 12. You may recognise the actress as 25-year-old Sophie Rundle, who plays Ada Shelby in BBC2's Peaky Blinders. That's the more glamorous role, but it's her performance in this two-part crime drama that really reveals Rundle's charm. This adaptation clearly struggled to sort the story's myriad details into a properly paced sixty minutes, but once you gave up on following the murder plot, there was plenty else to enjoy. The four previous one-off dramas in Sky Living's Drama Matters series have varied from unsatisfying morsels to hearty dramatic meals. Like one of Kimberly's perfectly baked canapés, Talking to the Dead offered just enough flavour to tantalise, while leaving us hungry for the next course."

Cast

 Sophie Rundle as DC Fiona Griffiths 
 Russell Tovey as DS Huw Brydon 
 Mark Lewis Jones as DCI Owen Jackson 
 Lois Winstone as Stacey Edwards 
 Christine Tremarco as DC Eluned 'Elli' Jones 
 Keith Allen as Robbie Griffiths
 Syrus Lowe as DC Carl Richards 
 Ivana Bašić as Asya Adamkute 
 Adrian Schiller as Dr. Price 
 Mufrida Hayes	as Sue Phillips 
 Niall Greig Fulton as Aras Kalvaitis 
 Hywel Morgan as Paul Fletcher 
 Michael Smiley as David Penry 
 Jens Hultén as Lev 
 Jay Simpson as Jimmy Dawkins 
 Manon Eames as Gwen Griffiths 
 Anita Reynolds as Deryn Franklin 
 Amita Dhiri as Mrs. Rattigan 
 Richard Tunley as DCI Matthews
 Huw Davies as Graham Redmond 
 Keith Woodason as Jon Carey 
 Karli Vale as Caron Rhys
 Amy Loughton as Andi Rodriguez

Episodes

References

External links
 

2013 British television series debuts
2013 British television series endings
2010s British crime drama television series
2010s British police procedural television series
2010s British television miniseries
Sky Living original programming
English-language television shows
Television shows set in Cardiff
Mental health in fiction